Barra McGrory, KC (born 1959) is a Northern Ireland solicitor and barrister. From 2011 to 2017, he served as the Director of Public Prosecutions for Northern Ireland.

Early life and education
McGrory was born in 1959 in Belfast, Northern Ireland. He was one of four children and the only son of P.J. and Phyllis McGrory. His father was "one of Northern Ireland's best known criminal lawyers". He studied ancient history and Celtic studies at Queen's University Belfast, graduating with a Bachelor of Arts (BA) degree in 1983.

Legal career
McGrory's legal career has been spent in criminal law. In 1987, he qualified as a solicitor. He served as Chairman of the Solicitor's Criminal Bar Association for 1990. In 2007, he was made a Queen's Counsel (QC); he was the first Northern Irish solicitor to be made a QC. In 2009, he was called to the bar, thereby becoming a barrister. During his private practice, he represented a wide range of clients, including Martin McGuinness, Gerry Adams, loyalist paramilitaries, Unionist politicians and former police officers.

In November 2011, McGrory was appointed the Director of Public Prosecutions for Northern Ireland (DPP). He is the first Roman Catholic to hold the post. On 17 May 2017, he announced that he would be stepping down as DPP when his term in office ends in September 2017.

McGrory has denied that his resignation is related to escalating allegations of bias by senior UK politicians and others, who have accused his office of prioritising prosecutions of former British soldiers for their actions during the Troubles. He was quoted as saying he regretted the legacy issue had become part of the story of his tenure and wished the mechanisms were in place to deal with the past and investigations into Troubles cases.

Personal life
McGrory is a Roman Catholic. He is married to Brigid O'Neill, an ecologist and musician. They have two children.

References

  

 
 
 

Living people
Solicitors from Northern Ireland
Northern Ireland King's Counsel
Barristers from Northern Ireland
Alumni of Queen's University Belfast
1959 births